The Willaq Umu ("priest who recounts", hispanicized spelling Villac Umu) were the High Priests of the Sun in the Inca Empire.  They were usually the brothers of the Sapa Inca (the ruler of the empire), and most likely the second most powerful person in the entire empire.  This office (in some accounts) was created during the reign of Pachakuti.  By the end of the empire, the high priest was also the field marshals in war for the emperor.

The Sun God in Inca mythology was Inti, and the most important god amongst the pantheon the Inca people.  In part, this is why the most powerful priest in the empire was the high priest to the most revered god.

References

D'Altroy, Terence. the Incas. Malden MA: Blackwell Publishing, 2003

Inca